Neptis radha, the great yellow sailer, is a species of nymphalid butterfly found in Asia.

Subspecies
Neptis radha radha (north-eastern India to central Vietnam)
Neptis radha asterastilis Oberthür, 1891 (Laos, north-eastern Burma)
Neptis radha sinensis Oberthür, 1906 (western China (Szechwan))

References

radha
Butterflies of Indochina
Butterflies described in 1857